A number of steamships have carried the name Invicta.

, built for the London, Chatham & Dover Railway, scrapped in 1899
, built for the South Eastern & Chatham Railway, sold in 1923
, Built for the Southern Railway, scrapped in 1972

Ship names